Personal Services is a 1987 British comedy film directed by Terry Jones and written by David Leland, about the rise of a madam of a suburban brothel which caters to older men. The story is inspired by the real experiences of Cynthia Payne, the "House of Cyn" madam.

Plot
Christine Painter is a sexually naive waitress and single mother who pays for her teenage son David's tuition by renting London flats to call girls. When a landlord confronts her for illegally subletting the flats and falling behind on the rent, Christine gives him a handjob in lieu of rent. After one of her "tenants", Rose, refuses to pay rent, Christine realizes she can do sex work herself in the flat Rose abandons.

Christine is charged with soliciting and pleads guilty in court. Soon she hatches a scheme with fellow sex worker Shirley to provide strictly kinky services such as bondage and fetish roleplay to an upscale clientele.
They rent a suburban house where they are joined by their "maid" Dolly.

Christine attends her sister's wedding, where Dolly is accidentally exposed as transgender to the groom's mother. Christine's father and sister angrily denounce her for spoiling the wedding.

Christine's father later visits the brothel for sex and reconciles with his daughter. The brothel enjoys brisk business but soon attracts the notice of the police, who raid the house on Christmas Eve.

When Christine appears in court to be arraigned, she is relieved when she realizes the judge is one of her main clients, she then imagines the courtroom filled with all of her clients as judges.

Cast

 Julie Walters as Christine Painter
 Shirley Stelfox as Shirley
 Alec McCowen as Wing Commander Morten
 Danny Schiller as Dolly
 Tim Woodward as Timms
 Victoria Hardcastle as Rose
 Dave Atkins as Sydney
 Ewan Hooper as Edward
 Alan Bowyer as David Painter
 Antony Carrick as Edgar
 Beverley Foster as Elizabeth
 Leon Lissek as Mr. Popozogolou
 Michelle Collins as June
 Peter Cellier as Mr. Marples
 Benjamin Whitrow as Mr. Marsden
 Stephen Lewis as Mr. Dunkley
John Shrapnel as Lionel
Anthony Collin as Mr Webb
Nigel Le Vaillant as The Man
Ron Pember as Ron
Arthur Whybrow as Max
John Bailey as Mr Gardner
 Carolyn Allen as Carol
Ivor Roberts as Glossop
Arthur Cox as Lennox
Stanley Lebor as Jones
Sheila Gill as Mrs Winter
Jagdish Kumar as Mr Shah
Badi Uzzaman as Mr Patel
 Charlotte Seeley (aka Charlotte Alexandra) as Diane

Reception
Personal Services opened at 5 cinemas in central London on 3 April 1987 and was the highest-grossing film in London for the week with a gross of £57,775. It reached number one nationally in the UK after 10 weeks of release and was number one for two weeks. The film was the second highest-grossing British film of the year in the UK, behind only The Living Daylights, with a gross of £1,952,017 ($3.2 million). It grossed $1,744,164 in the United States and Canada.

Ban
The film was banned in the Republic of Ireland upon theatrical release (although the ban was lifted two months later). At the time, there were four films that were banned in Ireland, and Jones had directed three of them (Personal Services, Monty Python's Life of Brian, and Monty Python's The Meaning of Life).

References

External links
 
 
 
 

1987 films
1987 comedy films
1980s biographical films
British comedy films
British biographical films
Films about prostitution in the United Kingdom
BDSM in films
Films directed by Terry Jones
Films scored by John Du Prez
British independent films
Films produced by Tim Bevan
1980s English-language films
1980s British films